Ispartaspor is a Turkish football (soccer) team from the city of Isparta in Isparta Province. The team currently plays in Group 7 of the Turkish Regional Amateur League. Pink and green are the club's colours.

External links
Ispartaspor on TFF.org
 Supporters group

 
Sport in Isparta
Football clubs in Turkey
1967 establishments in Turkey
Association football clubs established in 1967